Richard Cornwall may refer to:

Richard Cornwall (died 1533), MP for Herefordshire
Richard Cornwall (died 1569) (1493–1569), MP for Pembrokeshire and Much Wenlock
 Richard of Cornwall